Danielle Young is an English footballer who plays as a forward for Fylde.

Club career
Danielle Young spent much of her career at Manchester City, playing with them from her teenage years until 2014. Though she was part of City's team in their first year as a professional side in the 2014 season when they joined the FA WSL, Young featured only intermittently and finally parted with the club at the end of the season. She was signed shortly afterwards by WSL 2 side Everton but made only three appearances before opting to take a break from football in July 2015.

Danielle Young would return from her sabbatical in 2016 when she signed for Fylde playing in the FA Women's National League.

Career statistics

Club

Honours
Manchester City
Women's League Cup: 2014

References

Living people
English women's footballers
Women's association football forwards
Manchester City W.F.C. players
Everton F.C. (women) players
Women's Super League players
FA Women's National League players
Fylde Ladies F.C. players
1990 births